The West Virginia Mountaineers baseball team is the varsity intercollegiate baseball program of West Virginia University, located in Morgantown, West Virginia, United States. The program has been a member of the NCAA Division I Big 12 Conference since the start of the 2013 season.  The program currently plays at Monongalia County Ballpark in the adjacent city of Granville. Randy Mazey has been the team's head coach since prior to the 2013 season.  As of the end of the 2019 season, the program has appeared in 13 NCAA Tournaments.  It has won five conference tournament championships and 15 regular season conference and division titles.

History
The program began varsity play in 1892 and had an above-.500 winning percentage in each season until 1920, when the team had a 10–11 record.  It adopted the nickname "Mountaineers" in 1905, when West Virginia instituted the state motto "Mountaineers are always free."

After discontinuing the program for three seasons (1943–1945) because of World War II, the program began again prior to the 1946 season and qualified for its first NCAA Tournament in 1955 under head coach Steve Harrick.

On-campus venue Hawley Field opened in 1971 and was used for all home games until after the 2012 season, as the field did not meet the standards of the Big 12 Conference, to which West Virginia moved in summer 2012. It remained in use for non-conference home games through the 2014 season, after which the team's current venue, Monongalia County Ballpark, opened.

As a member of the Southern Conference from 1951–1968, the team appeared in six NCAA Tournaments.  As a member of the Atlantic 10 Conference from 1978–1995, the team appeared in four NCAA Tournaments.  However, as a member of the Big East Conference from 1995–2012, the team appeared in only one NCAA Tournament.

Conference affiliations
Independent – 1892–1942, 1946–1950, 1969–1977
Southern – 1951–1968
Atlantic 10 – 1978–1995
Known as the Eastern Athletic Association, popularly the Eastern 8,  from 1978–1982
Big East – 1996–2012
Big 12 – 2013–present

Stadium

Monongalia County Ballpark

In 2013, plans were announced to build the program a new Morgantown venue.  Ground was broken for the new ballpark at University Town Centre, an off-campus shopping and entertainment complex in nearby Granville, on October 17, 2013.  The ballpark will be a fan friendly design with 2,500 fixed seats with additional hillside and club seating, a fan amenity deck, and a park that will be open year-round.  The field will be a synthetic surface, other than the clay pitcher's mound.  Also using the new ballpark will be the class-A short-season affiliate of the Pittsburgh Pirates, the West Virginia Black Bears. The stadium, tentatively known as Monongalia County Ballpark, is set to open for the 2015 season.

Head coaches
The program's most successful coach is former head coach Dale Ramsburg, who had 540 career victories from 1968–1994.  Ramsburg is also the program's longest tenured head coach, having led the program for 27 seasons.

Yearly record
Below is a table of the program's yearly records.

West Virginia in the NCAA tournament 

The NCAA Division I baseball tournament started in 1947.

Notable former players

Mountaineers in Major League Baseball
Below is a list of notable former players of the program and the seasons in which they played for the Mountaineers.

Babe Barna (1935–1937)
Frank Barron (1913–1914)
David Carpenter (2004–2006)
Bucky Guth (1967–1969)
Jedd Gyorko (2008–2010)
Jim Heise (1953–1956)
Charlie Hickman (1897)
Joe Hudson (1990–1992)
Steve Kline (1993)
Alek Manoah (2017–2019)
Ryan McBroom (2011–2014)
John Means (2013–2014)
Harrison Musgrave (2011–2014)
Dustin Nippert (2003)
Paul Popovich (1960)
Scott Seabol (1996)
Darrell Whitmore (1988–1990)
John Woods (1920–1923)

See also
List of NCAA Division I baseball programs

References

External links